The Will Rogers Stakes was an American Grade IIIT Thoroughbred horse race.

Run annually in the latter part of May at Hollywood Park Racetrack in Inglewood, California, the race is open to three-year-old horses. It is run over a distance of one mile on turf and currently carries a purse of $100,000. Run as a handicap prior to 2001. Run at one mile since 1995. Run exclusively on turf since 1969. Run for 3-year-olds & up in 1938, 1944.

The race was named for legendary American humorist and horseman Will Rogers who died in 1935.

Among the notable winners of this race are two U.S. Racing Hall of Fame inductees. Swaps won the 1955 Kentucky Derby and, in his next outing, won the Will Rogers Stakes by twelve lengths. Round Table won the race in 1957 by three and a half lengths.

In 2010, the Will Rogers was lengthened to 1 1/16-mile.

Winners of the Will Rogers Stakes since 2000

Earlier winners (partial list)

 1999 - Eagleton
 1998 - Magical
 1997 - Brave Act
 1996 - Let Bob Do It
 1995 - Via Lombardia
 1994 - Unfinished Symph 
 1993 - Future Storm
 1992 - The Name's Jimmy
 1991 - Compelling Sound
 1990 - Itsallgreektome
 1989 - Notorious Pleasure
 1988 - Word Pirate
 1987 - Something Lucky
 1986 - Mazaad
 1985 - Pine Belt
 1984 - Tsunami Slew
 1983 - Barberstown
 1982 - Give Me Strength
 1982 - Sword Blade
 1981 - Splendid Spruce
 1980 - Stiff Diamond
 1979 - Ibacache
 1978 - April Axe
 1977 - Nordic Prince
 1976 - Madera Sun
 1975 - Uniformity
 1974 - Stardust Mel
 1973 - Groshawk
 1972 - Quack
 1971 - Dr. Knighton
 1971 - Fast Fellow
 1970 - Lime
 1970 - Whittingham
 1969 - Tell
 1968 - Poleax
 1967 - Jungle Road
 1966 - Ri Tux
 1966 - Aqua Vite
 1965 - Terry's Secret
 1964 - Count Charles
 1963 - Viking Spirit
 1963 - Bre'r Rabbit
 1962 - Wallet Lifter
 1962 - Prince Of Plenty
 1961 - Four-and-Twenty
 1960 - Flow Line
 1959 - Ole Fols
 1958 - Hillsdale
 1957 - Round Table
 1956 - Terrang
 1955 - Swaps
 1954 - Don McCoy
 1953 - Imbros
 1952 - Forelock
 1951 - Gold Note
 1950 - (Not run)
 1949 - Blue Dart (Run at Santa Anita)
 1948 - Speculation
 1947 - On Trust
 1946 - Burra Sahib
 1945 - Quick Reward
 1944 - Phar Rong
 1943 - (Not run)
 1942 - (Not run)
 1941 - Battle Colors
 1940 - Sweepida
 1939 - Time Alone
 1938 - Dogaway

External link
 The Will Rogers Stakes at Pedigree Query

References
 The Will Rogers Stakes at the NTRA (retrieved November 8, 2007)

Discontinued horse races in the United States
Horse races in California
Hollywood Park Racetrack
Graded stakes races in the United States
Flat horse races for three-year-olds
Turf races in the United States